Germany is the third largest music market in the world and the second largest in Europe.

This is a list of the best-selling singles in Germany, some of which have been certified by the Bundesverband Musikindustrie (BVMI). Since June 1, 2014, BVMI certifies a single platinum for the download or shipment of 400,000 copies across Germany.

Certifications for singles released in Germany depend upon their release date.

Gold and Platinum certification awards (Timeline)

Best-selling singles in Germany

Notes

See also
 List of best-selling albums in Germany

References

Germany
Best-selling singles